Lakha ( "language of the mountain pass", also called "Tshangkha") is a Southern Tibetic language spoken by about 8,000 people in Wangdue Phodrang and Trongsa Districts in central Bhutan. Lakha is spoken by descendants of pastoral yakherd communities.

See also
Languages of Bhutan

References

Languages of Bhutan
South Bodish languages